Powell Township is a civil township of Marquette County in the U.S. state of Michigan.  The population was 732 at the 2020 census.

Communities 
 Big Bay is an unincorporated community, post office, and census-designated place in the township. The post office with ZIP code 49808 provides P.O. box service for a portion of Powell Township.
Officials named it for its location in deer country.
 Birch is a former lumber camp at  that was a station on a spur of the Lake Superior and Ishpeming Railroad between Marquette and Big Bay. The settlement formed around the Northern Lumber Company mill and general store. A post office operated from November 21, 1905 until March 31, 1920.
 Homeier is a former lumber camp at  that was a station on a spur of the Lake Superior and Ishpeming Railroad between Marquette and Big Bay.
 Huron Mountain was the name of a summer post office at  that operated from 1914 to 1956, and 1957–1958. The office was named from its location at the northern edge of the Huron Mountains.
 The city of Marquette is to the southeast, and the Marquette ZIP code 49855 serves portions of southeast Powell Township.

Geography

The Huron Mountains make up a large part of the township.

Demographics
As of the census of 2000, there were 724 people, 333 households, and 228 families residing in the township.  The population density was 4.7 per square mile (1.8/km).  There were 818 housing units at an average density of 5.3 per square mile (2.0/km).  The racial makeup of the township was 96.27% White, 1.93% Native American, 0.14% Asian, and 1.66% from two or more races.

There were 333 households, out of which 21.0% had children under the age of 18 living with them, 58.6% were married couples living together, 4.5% had a female householder with no husband present, and 31.5% were non-families. 27.9% of all households were made up of individuals, and 11.4% had someone living alone who was 65 years of age or older.  The average household size was 2.17 and the average family size was 2.61.

In the township the population was spread out, with 17.5% under the age of 18, 5.2% from 18 to 24, 25.3% from 25 to 44, 34.8% from 45 to 64, and 17.1% who were 65 years of age or older.  The median age was 46 years. For every 100 females, there were 111.7 males.  For every 100 females age 18 and over, there were 114.0 males.

The median income for a household in the township was $34,659, and the median income for a family was $42,969. Males had a median income of $36,250 versus $21,944 for females. The per capita income for the township was $19,391.  About 5.0% of families and 8.1% of the population were below the poverty line, including 9.2% of those under age 18 and 4.0% of those age 65 or over.

References

Townships in Marquette County, Michigan
Townships in Michigan
Populated places established in 1904
1904 establishments in Michigan
Michigan populated places on Lake Superior